Ekkattuthangal, also known as Ekkaduthangal or Ekkatuthangal, is a neighborhood in Chennai city, Tamil Nadu, India. It is surrounded by Jafferkhanpet, Guindy and Ramapuram. Area pincode is 600032, and previously it was 600097. 

The neighborhood is known for factories involved in lathes, milling, and welding. The neighborhood is located close to Kathipara Junction, which is the center point of the city, connecting to Chennai Mofussil Bus Terminus, Chennai International Airport, Chennai Central railway station and Sriperumbudur. This area is also known for having two big Media houses Jaya TV and Pudiyathala Murai. Abutting the Guindy Industrial Estate, the region is experiencing rapid growth including technology parks like Olympia Tech Park, Thamarai Tech Park and Virtusa and five-star luxury hotels such as the Hilton Chennai. The Chennai Metro railway station at Ekkattuthangal became operational on 29 June 2015.

Location in context

References 

 Chennai district website

Neighbourhoods in Chennai